Promethium(III) iodide is an inorganic compound, with the chemical formula of PmI3. It is radioactive.

Preparation 
Promethium(III) iodide is obtained by reacting anhydrous hydrogen iodide and promethium(III) chloride at a high temperature:

 PmCl3 + 3 HI → PmI3 + 3 HCl

From the reaction of a HI-H2 mixture and promethium oxide (Pm2O3), only promethium oxyiodide (PmOI) can be obtained. Promethium oxide reacts with molten aluminum iodide at 500°C to form promethium iodide.

References 

Iodides
Promethium compounds
Lanthanide halides